In biology, homotopic connectivity is the connectivity between mirror areas of the human brain hemispheres.

Changes in the homotopic connectivity are to disorders such as melancholic depression, major depressive disorder, schizophrenia and cortical seizures.

References 

Brain anatomy